The Rumpel–Leede sign is a distal shower of petechiae that occurs immediately after the release of pressure from a tourniquet or sphygmomanometer.

See also 
 Skin lesion

References 

Dermatologic signs